The Joint Center for Political and Economic Studies (also known in abbreviated form as Joint Center) is an American public policy think tank headquartered in Washington, DC. According to its mission statement, the Joint Center, through research, policy roundtables, and publications, produces innovative, high-impact ideas, research, and policy solutions that have a positive impact on people and communities of color. Ranking at #50 on the University of Pennsylvania's 2017 Global Go To Think Tank Index Report, the Joint Center served as the intellectual hub for a generation of post-Civil Rights era black thinkers, including Maynard Jackson, Mary Frances Berry, William Julius Wilson, Shirley Chisholm and John Hope Franklin. Originally founded in 1970 to provide training and technical assistance to newly elected African American officials, the Joint Center has since expanded its portfolio to include a range of public policy issues of concern to African-Americans, AAPIs, Latinos, and Native Americans.

History, achievements, major initiatives

Origins

During the Civil Rights Movement, more and more blacks were being elected to public office.  Many of these new black elected officials, or "BEOs", knew little about the ropes of their new jobs, such as political networking or even day-to-day administration.  What's more, they couldn't count on help from their more experienced and better-connected white colleagues.

At two national conferences -- Chicago in 1967 and Washington DC in 1969—BEOs expressed a need for a new organization, one that would provide new BEOs training and assistance that would give them a foothold in the mainstream American political process.
In April 1970 The Joint Center for Political Studies (its original name) was begun with a two-year $860,000 grant from Ford Foundation.  Howard University law professor Frank Reeves served as the center's first executive director.  The first board chairman was Louis (“Louie”) Martin, a newspaper editor who would later serve in the Jimmy Carter administration.

Early years
In July 1972, Eddie N. Williams, director of the University of Chicago's Center for Policy Study, became the Joint Center's new president.  Williams' varied background—he was a former journalist and staff assistant in both the U.S. Senate U.S. Department of State—positioned him to forge the center into a full-fledged think tank, one that would "identify public policy issues that have implications for [black Americans] ... to be both a center for intellectual discovery and a wellspring of practical knowledge."

Williams expanded the staff, increased the amount and scope of the center's publication, and organized conferences around the country to aid BEOs.  Joint Center data and research began to garner attention from legislative and judicial arenas.

In anticipation of the 1976 general elections, the Joint Center formed the National Coalition on Black Voter Participation (now an independent coalition of 80 organizations), which increased voter registration and turnout during a campaign season that put Carter the White House by a slim margin.  In October of the same year, the Joint Center became completely independent from Howard University and the Metropolitan Applied Research Center, which had had joint oversight since the Joint Center's birth.

As the number of BEOs grew, the center's role changed.  The Joint Center helped form the National Conference of Black Mayors and the National Caucus of Black State Legislators, which began to take on much of the political assistance to black politicians the center had been doing.   (The Joint Center also formed the Committee of Policy for Racial Justice around this time.)

By the 1980s the Joint Center's new leadership, including Margaret Simms, who served as president from 1986 to 2007, realigned the Joint Center’ mission to serve as a full-fledged black think tank for scholarly research on social and economic issues; they believed that the civil rights movement had outgrown reliance on the charismatic leadership of a few individuals,. Through that decade and into the next, the Joint Center published extensive research on bars to minority voting and the effects of redistricting on black political power, and increased ties with non-black minority groups.

By the 1990s the Joint Center's research into a range of economic issues – expanding income gaps, the increased role of blacks in the U.S. economy, the condition of young black males and children, the accuracy of the U.S. Census, and the North American Free Trade Agreement – prompted the change to the group's current name.  But the group has continued to engage in some political assistance activities, such as providing training to South Africa’s new post-Apartheid political parties.

2000 and after

In 2002, the W.K. Kellogg Foundation gave the Joint Center a $7 million grant to establish the Health Policy Institute, which, Joint Center representatives said, will
 improve the health of black Americans and other minorities and "expand their effective participation in the political and public policy arenas around health issues."
 "identify and promote effective solutions to the problem of health disparities."
 "inform members of Congress and national organizations on [health] issues."

In February 2014, the Joint Center appointed Spencer Overton, a George Washington University Law Professor, as interim president and chief executive officer.

Subgroups
 Health Policy Institute
 Dellums Commission

Publications and periodicals
 Engaging Communities in Reducing Gun Violence
 Racial Diversity Among Top Senate Staff
 50 Years of the Voting Rights Act
 Focus magazine
 A National Roster of Elected Officials
 DataBank for Community Statistics

Governance / Organization
 President: Spencer Overton (February 2014 – Present)
 Chair: Barbara L. Johnson, Partner Paul, Hastings, Janofsky & Walker LLP
 Secretary: Robert Raben, President and Founder, The Raben Group
 Treasurer: Robert R. Hagans, Jr., Chief Financial Officer, National Association of Counties

References

External links

Joint Center for Political and Economic Studies

1970 establishments in Washington, D.C.
Think tanks based in Washington, D.C.
Think tanks established in 1970
Non-profit organizations based in Washington, D.C.